Siobhan Miller is a Scottish folk singer and the only three-time winner of Best Singer at the Scots Trad Music Awards (in 2011, 2013, and 2017). She also won the Best Traditional Track at the 2018 BBC Radio 2 Folk Awards and has frequently performed at Celtic Connections.

Discography
In a Bleeze (2008) (with Jeana Leslie)
Shadows Tall (2010) (with Jeana Leslie)
Flight of Time (2014)
Strata (2017)
Mercury (2018)
All Is Not Forgotten (2020)
Bloom (2022)

References

Scottish folk singers
21st-century Scottish women singers
Year of birth missing (living people)
Living people
Vertical Records artists